El laberinto is a 2012 Colombian drama produced by Caracol TV and Sony Pictures Entertainment, broadcast on Caracol TV. It is the sequel to the successful 1997 weekly series La mujer del presidente.

Plot
One day, Carlos Buendía finds his wife missing, his daughter in danger of death, about to be fired from his job, and fearing revenge from a mysterious woman because of something terrible which happened 15 years before.

Cast
Róbinson Díaz as Carlos Alberto Buendía
Sandra Reyes as Adriana Guerrero
Luis Fernando Hoyos as Ernesto
Claudia Moreno as Bárbara
Jorge Cao as Francisco de Paula Acero
Roberto Cano as Andrés Acero
Alma Rodríguez as Robin
Adelaida López as Verónica Buendía

Episodes
 Enemigos del pasado llegan para cobrar venganza (2012-01-10; rating: 9.6)

References

External links
  Official website

2012 Colombian television series debuts
2012 Colombian television series endings
Colombian drama television series
Thriller television series
Caracol Televisión original programming
Spanish-language television shows
Television shows set in Colombia
Sony Pictures Television telenovelas